Alessandro Pilati (born 26 March 2000) is an Italian professional footballer who plays as a centre back for Feralpisalò.

Club career
Born in Mantua, Pilati started his career on local club Mantova. In 2016 he joined to Sassuolo youth system.

On 3 September 2020, he was loaned to Serie C club Imolese. He scored his first professional goal on 13 October 2020 against Carpi.

On 28 July 2021, Pilati was loaned to Mantova.

On 15 July 2022, Pilati signed a three-year deal with Feralpisalò.

References

External links
 
 
 

2000 births
Living people
Sportspeople from Mantua
Footballers from Lombardy
Italian footballers
Association football defenders
Serie C players
U.S. Sassuolo Calcio players
Imolese Calcio 1919 players
Mantova 1911 players
FeralpiSalò players